NGC 6820 is a small reflection nebula near the open cluster NGC 6823 in Vulpecula. The reflection nebula and cluster are embedded in a large faint emission nebula called Sh 2-86. The whole area of nebulosity is often referred to as NGC 6820.

M27, the Dumbbell Nebula, is found three degrees to the east, and α Vulpeculae three degrees to the west.

Open star cluster NGC 6823 is about 50 light-years across and lies about 6,000 light-years away. The center of the cluster formed about two million years ago and is dominated in brightness by a host of bright young blue stars. Outer parts of the cluster contain even younger stars. It forms the core of the Vulpecula OB1 stellar association.

Image gallery

References

External links

National Optical Observatory 

6820
NGC 6823
H II regions
Vulpecula
Sharpless objects
18630808
Star-forming regions